Events from the year 1151 in Ireland.

Incumbents
High King: Toirdelbach Ua Conchobair

Events
The Battle of Móin Mhór was fought in 1151 between the kingdoms of Leinster and Thomond in Ireland. The Kingdom of Leinster was victorious.

References